Upper Shirley may refer to:

In England
Upper Shirley, Croydon, London
Upper Shirley, Southampton, Hampshire
In the United States
Upper Shirley, Virginia in Charles City County